Pantsdrunk (stylized as Päntsdrunk;) is a form of drinking culture, originating in Finland, in which the drinker consumes alcoholic drinks at home dressed in very little clothing, usually underwear, with no intention of going out. To a large extent, it is still considered a way of life in Finland, possibly related to the stereotyped lack of social contacts among Finns. The forced isolation of people in their own homes caused by the global COVID-19 pandemic created a global trend for this drinking habit.

In popular culture
The Australian brewery Two Birds Brewing launched a line of beers called Kalsarikännit in 2020.

See also 

 Drinking in Finland

References

Further reading

External links 

 
 
 

Drinking culture
Finnish culture
Activities in underwear
Alcohol in Finland